Philipp Heigl (born ) is an Austrian cyclo-cross cyclist. He represented his nation in the men's elite event at the 2016 UCI Cyclo-cross World Championships  in Heusden-Zolder.

Major results
2013–2014
 2nd National Under-23 Championships
2014–2015
 2nd National Under-23 Championships
2017–2018
 3rd National Championships
2019–2020
 2nd National Championships
2021–2022
 3rd National Championships
2022–2023
 2nd National Championships

References

External links
 

1993 births
Living people
Cyclo-cross cyclists
Austrian male cyclists
Place of birth missing (living people)
21st-century Austrian people